Shiroro is a Local Government Area in Niger State, Nigeria. Its headquarters is in the town of Kuta, which has fifteen [15] wards as follows: 
Allawa
Bangajiya
Bassa/kukoki
Egwa/gwada
Erena
Galkogo
Gurmana
Gussoro
Kato
Kushaka/kurebe
Kwaki/chukuba
Manta
Pina
She
Ubandoma
 and their major language is Gbagyi.

The postal code of the area is 921.

See also
Shiroro Airstrip
Shiroro Hydroelectric Power Station
List of dams and reservoirs in Nigeria

References

Local Government Areas in Niger State